The 99th Massachusetts General Court, consisting of the Massachusetts Senate and the Massachusetts House of Representatives, met in 1878 during the governorship of Alexander H. Rice. John B. D. Cogswell served as president of the Senate and John Davis Long served as speaker of the House.

Senators

Representatives

See also
 1878 Massachusetts gubernatorial election
 45th United States Congress
 List of Massachusetts General Courts

References

Further reading
  (includes description of legislature)

External links
 
 

Political history of Massachusetts
Massachusetts legislative sessions
massachusetts
1878 in Massachusetts